Tegal Alur is an administrative village in the Kalideres district of Indonesia. It has postal code of 11820.

See also 
 Kalideres
 List of administrative villages of Jakarta

West Jakarta
Administrative villages in Jakarta